Armando Riviera (born 8 September 1937) is an Italian politician who served as Mayor of Novara (1981–1991) and as Senator (1992–1994).

References

1937 births
Living people
Mayors of Novara
Senators of Legislature XI of Italy
20th-century Italian politicians
Italian Socialist Party politicians
People from Novara